Hellmuth Guido Alexander Heye (9 August 1895 – 10 November 1970) was a German admiral in World War II and politician in post-war Germany. He was a recipient of the Knight's Cross of the Iron Cross of Nazi Germany.

Naval career
Heye graduated from high school in Berlin in early 1914 and immediately joined the Imperial Navy. From April 1939 to September 1940 he commanded the Heavy Cruiser Admiral Hipper. While taking his ship to Trondheim in April 1940 to land invasion troops there (Operation Weserübung), he encountered the British destroyer  and sank it. Heye sent a message to the British Admiralty through the Red Cross praising the gallantry of Glowworm'''s commander and crew, and this contributed to LtCdr Gerard Roope receiving the earliest Victoria Cross of World War II, although the award was not made until 1945.

Heye received the Knight's Cross of the Iron Cross on 18 January 1941. In 1942 he was promoted to vice admiral, and from September to November 1942 he was commanding admiral of the German naval forces in the Black Sea. From April 1944 onward he was commanding admiral of the small naval combat forces, which included mini-submarines, combat divers, etc.

Civilian career
After the war Heye published a number of works on naval strategy, history and warfare as a member of the Naval Historical Team. He subsequently advised the German government on issues concerning the establishment and organization of a new military. In 1953 he joined the center-right party CDU (Christian Democratic Union) of Chancellor Konrad Adenauer and represented this party in the Federal Parliament (Bundestag) from 1953 to 1961, elected for the district of Wilhelmshaven-Friesland.

On 8 November 1961 the Bundestag elected him unanimously as its Ombudsman for the Military (Wehrbeauftragter). In the autumn of 1964, Heye published a series of articles in the German news journal Quick, warning of a risk of the German military once again drifting into isolation from society at large. This triggered a vigorous and sharply worded debate between him and the ministry of defense. Frustrated by what he perceived to be inadequate support from Parliament, Heye resigned his position on 10 November 1964.

Awards
 Iron Cross (1914) 2nd Class (14 February 1918) & 1st Class (15 March 1922)
 Friedrich August Cross, 2nd Class (14 February 1918)
 U-boat War Badge (20 November 1926)
 Wehrmacht Long Service Award 4th to 2nd Class (2 October 1936)
 Commander of the Order of the Crown of Italy (13 December 1937)
 Sudetenland Medal (22 May 1939)(2 October 1936)
 Memel Medal (26 October 1939)(2 October 1936); 1st Class (11 February 1939)
 Clasp to the Iron Cross (1939)   2nd Class (23 February 1940) & 1st Class (14 April 1940)
 Knight's Cross of the Iron Cross on 18 January 1941 as Kapitän zur See'' and commander of heavy cruiser Admiral Hipper
 High Seas Fleet Badge (16 February 1942)
 Officer of the Order of the Crown of Romania (15 January 1943)

References

Citations

Bibliography

External links 

1895 births
1970 deaths
People from the Rhine Province
People from Merzig-Wadern
Vice admirals of the Kriegsmarine
Military Ombudspersons in Germany
Imperial German Navy personnel of World War I
Recipients of the clasp to the Iron Cross, 1st class
Recipients of the Knight's Cross of the Iron Cross
Officers of the Order of the Crown (Romania)
Members of the Bundestag for Lower Saxony
Reichsmarine personnel
Naval Historical Team members
Members of the Bundestag for the Christian Democratic Union of Germany
German military writers
Military personnel from Saarland